Genoplesium formosum, commonly known as the Cathcart midge orchid is a small terrestrial orchid found in southern New South Wales. It has a single thin leaf and up to twenty five dark reddish purple flowers with darker lines.

Description
As with others in the genus, the flowers are inverted so that the labellum is above the column rather than below it. There is a callus in the centre of the labellum and extending nearly to its tip. Flowering occurs between October and December.

Taxonomy and naming
Genoplesium formosum was first formally described in 2001 by David Jones from a specimen collected in the Wadbilliga National Park and the description was published in The Orchadian. In 2002 Jones and Mark Clements changed the name to Corunastylis formosa but the change is not accepted by the Australian Plant Census. The specific epithet (formosum) is a Latin word meaning “beautifully formed” or "handsome".

Distribution and habitat
The Cathcart midge orchid grows with shrubs or grasses near streams or near swamps. It is found in isolated populations between Wadbilliga National Park and Cathcart.

References

formosum
Endemic orchids of Australia
Orchids of New South Wales
Plants described in 2001